The Family Tree is a 2011 American comedy-drama film directed by Vivi Friedman and written by Mark Lisson. The film stars Dermot Mulroney, Hope Davis, Chi McBride, Max Thieriot, Britt Robertson, Selma Blair, and Christina Hendricks. It was given a limited release in the United States by Entertainment One on August 26, 2011.

The music for the film was written by Stacey Hersh. Additionally, Amy Powers and Megan Cavallari co-wrote a song for the film.

Plot
A mother and wife stricken with memory loss allows a dysfunctional family a second chance at harmony and happiness.

Cast

Release
Entertainment One acquired the North American rights to the film in June 2011, and set the release date of August 26, 2011. The film was given a limited release in the United States.

Reception

Box office
The film made a total of $6,035 from two theaters in the U.S. during its two-week run.

Critical response
The film was largely panned by film critics. On review aggregator website Rotten Tomatoes the film received a rating of 10%, with a weighted average of 4.2/10, based on 20 reviews indicating "no consensus yet". Gary Goldstein of the Los Angeles Times wrote: "Director Vivi Friedman's inability to successfully reconcile the film's duality undercuts an eclectic cast gamely committed to Mark Lisson's thematically ambitious, if scattered, script." Chuck Bowen of Slant Magazine also gave a negative review, writing: "Sadly, The Family Tree squanders all [the] promise for the usual trite, bluntly written, and poorly staged testaments to love and family. Who needs that when you have a cast this game? A truly troubled family isn't, at the very least, this deadly dull." Stephen Holden of The New York Times heavily criticized the film, describing it as a "hyperactive screenplay by Mark Lisson that is so lacking in substance."

References

External links
 
 

2011 films
American comedy-drama films
2011 comedy-drama films
2010s English-language films
2010s American films